Santiago 'Santi' Ezquerro Marín (born 14 December 1976) is a Spanish former professional footballer who played as a forward.

Having made a name for himself at Athletic Bilbao, appearing in nearly 300 official games for the club in seven years, he subsequently earned himself a transfer to Barcelona, but failed to establish himself in three years, being used sparingly.

Over 13 seasons in La Liga, Ezquerro amassed totals of 278 matches and 55 goals.

Club career

Osasuna and Atlético
Born in Calahorra, La Rioja, Ezquerro emerged through the youth ranks of CA Osasuna, playing two second division seasons with the Navarrese before signing with Atlético Madrid for the 1996–97 campaign.

He made his La Liga debut on 21 September 1996 in a 3–0 away win against CD Logroñés, but was mainly registered with the club's B-side during his spell.

Athletic
Lack of playing opportunities with the Colchoneros prompted a January 1998 move to RCD Mallorca, which Ezquerro helped achieve runner-up accolades in the Copa del Rey in his six-month stint. Subsequently, he joined Athletic Bilbao, with whom he appeared in his first UEFA Champions League games while establishing as one of the most promising forwards in Spain's top flight, notably scoring in a 3–0 derby home victory over Real Sociedad on 9 April 2005.

His stellar form in 2004–05 – 47 official matches, 19 goals, including a hat-trick in a 7–1 away rout of Standard Liège for the season's UEFA Cup group stage– led to Ezquerro signing for FC Barcelona in a period of 3+1 years, on a free transfer.

Barcelona
Ezquerro was never able to establish himself in Barcelona's first team, his progress at the club being further hindered after the emergence of youth graduate Lionel Messi. His best league output consisted of 12 games in his first year (two goals, three starts, in 469 minutes of play).

In 2007–08, Ezquerro was not given the free transfer by the Catalans and, not being signed by any team in the summer on in the January transfer window, was virtually absent for the duration of the campaign, although he did score twice in January against lowly CD Alcoyano for the domestic cup's round of 32, in a 2–2 second leg home draw and 5–2 on aggregate.

Osasuna return and Retirement
In July 2008, Ezquerro was released by Barça and, late in the month, rejoined Osasuna in a 2+1-years deal. During his first season after his return he struggled with injuries and also failed to fit newly appointed coach José Antonio Camacho's plans, failing to  make the squad of 18 in any of the team's final matches.

Ezquerro was released after just one year – earning €1.4 million – and retired at 33, after not being able to find a new club in the following months.

International career
During his debut season for Athletic, Ezquerro won his sole cap for Spain, in a UEFA Euro 2000 qualifier against Cyprus, which ended with a 2–3 away loss and the sacking of coach Javier Clemente, on 5 September 1998.

Honours
Mallorca
Copa del Rey runner-up: 1997–98

Barcelona
La Liga: 2005–06
UEFA Champions League: 2005–06
FIFA Club World Cup runner-up: 2006
UEFA Super Cup runner-up: 2006

References

External links
 

1976 births
Living people
People from Calahorra
Spanish footballers
Footballers from La Rioja (Spain)
Association football forwards
La Liga players
Segunda División players
Segunda División B players
CA Osasuna B players
CA Osasuna players
Atlético Madrid B players
Atlético Madrid footballers
RCD Mallorca players
Athletic Bilbao footballers
FC Barcelona players
UEFA Champions League winning players
Spain under-21 international footballers
Spain international footballers